Yelü Xiyin (? — 982), also known by his title Prince of Song, was an imperial prince of the Liao dynasty. He was the eldest son of former Crown Prince Yelü Lihu by Empress Hejing. Xiyin married Lady Xiao, the second daughter of Prime minister Xiao Siwen.

Rebellions 
In 960, Yelü Xiyin plotted a rebellion against then-reigning Emperor Muzong (Emperor Taizong's son Yelü Jing). As a result, both he and  his father Yelü Lihu were arrested and placed in jail. Yelü Lihu died in jail, but he was subsequently released after Lady Xiao's brother-in-law Yelü Xian ascended to the throne as Emperor Jingzong.

However, Yelü Xiyin later planned another rebellion against Emperor Jingzong. He was captured, and his son with Lady Xiao was murdered by Liao troops in 982. Seeking revenge for her husband and son, Lady Xiao attempted to poison the then Empress Dowager Xiao Yanyan. She failed, and was forced to commit suicide.

In popular culture
Portrayed by Ji Chen in the 2020 Chinese TV series The Legend of Xiao Chuo.

References

982 deaths
Liao dynasty people
10th-century Khitan people
Yelü clan
Liao dynasty politicians
Liao dynasty rebels
Suicides in the Liao dynasty